August von Bayer (1803-1875) was a German painter of architectural subjects

Life
Bayer was born in May 1803 into a patrician Catholic family in Rorschach. He studied architecture under Weinbrenner, at Karlsruhe. In the mid-1820s he went to Munich, with the intention of pursuing a career in architecture, but soon turned to painting instead. His architectural education did, however provide him with a knowledge of construction rare amongst painters. He combined this knowledge with outstanding gifts  as  a colourist, which allowed him to tackle the most subtle effects of light.

In the early 1840s he moved to Baden-Baden, where his work came to the attention of a wider circle of prominent admirers, including Friedrich Wilhelm IV, King of  Hanover, and  Queen Augusta of Prussia. He spent the winters in Karlsruhe. In 1853 he was appointed him conservator of the monuments and antiquities in the Grand Duchy of Baden, a post to which he brought more of an aesthetic than a scientific outlook.

His last years were clouded by illness. He died in Karlsruhe on 2 February 1875.

Works
Among his best works are:
The interior of the Frauenkirche at Munich.
A portion of the Cathedral at Chur.
The Convent of Maulbronn.
The Organ Player (lithographed hy Fr. Hohe).
An interior of a Cloister (lithographed by Fr. Hohe) .

There are four works by him in the Pinakothek at Munich.

See also
 List of German painters

References

Sources
 

19th-century German painters
German male painters
1804 births
People from Rorschach, Switzerland
1875 deaths
19th-century German architects
19th-century German male artists